AS-103 was the third orbital flight test of a boilerplate Apollo spacecraft, and the first flight of a Pegasus micrometeroid detection satellite. Also known as SA-9, it was the third operational launch of a two-stage Saturn I launch vehicle.

Objectives
Of 12 flight objectives assigned, two were concerned with the operation of the Pegasus satellite, eight with launch vehicle systems performance, one with jettisoning the launch escape system, and one with separation of the boilerplate spacecraft. The satellite objectives were (1) demonstration of the functional operations of the mechanical, structural, and electronic systems and (2) evaluation of meteoroid data sampling in near-Earth orbit. Since the launch trajectory was designed to insert the Pegasus satellite into the proper orbit, it differed substantially from the trajectory used in missions AS-101 and AS-102.

Launch

The launch vehicle consisted of an S-I first stage, an S-IV second stage, and an instrument unit. The spacecraft consisted of a boilerplate command and service module, a launch escape system, and a service module/launch vehicle adapter (BP-16). The Pegasus 1 satellite was enclosed within the service module, attached to the S-IV stage. The orbital configuration consisted of the satellite mounted on the adapter, which remained attached to the instrument unit and the expended S-IV stage.

The vehicle was launched from Cape Kennedy Launch Complex 37B at 9:37:03 a.m. EST (14:37:03 GMT) on February 16, 1965. A hold of 1 hour and 7 minutes was caused by a power failure in the Eastern Test Range flight safety computer. A built-in hold of 30 minutes was also used to discharge and recharge a battery in the Pegasus satellite as a check that it was functioning properly.

The launch was normal, and the spacecraft was inserted into orbit approximately 10.5 minutes after launch. The launch escape system was jettisoned during launch and the command module was jettisoned after orbital insertion.

Results
The trajectory and space-fixed velocity were very nearly as planned. The Apollo shroud separated from the Pegasus satellite about 804 seconds after lift-off, and deployment of two meteoroid detection panel wings of the Pegasus satellite commenced about 1 minute later. The predicted useful lifetime of Pegasus A in orbit was 1188 days. The satellite was commanded off (decommissioned) on August 29, 1968. Although minor malfunctions occurred in both the launch vehicle and the Pegasus A satellite, mission AS-103 was a success in that all objectives were met. The spacecraft remained in orbit until July 10, 1985, when it re-entered the atmosphere and landed in the ocean.

References

External links

NSSDC: SA-9
SA-9/Apollo firing test report
Saturn SA-9/Pegasus A Postflight Trajectory

Apollo program
Spacecraft launched in 1965
1965 in the United States
Test spaceflights
Spacecraft launched by Saturn rockets